Dolji Ka Khera is a village in Chittorgarh district of Rajasthan State in India.It comes under Chhapari  Gram Panchayat in Kapasan block. Kapasan is nearest town to the Dolji Ka Khera village.
Dolji Ka Khera village is founded by Dolat Singh Tanwar in around 17th century and his ancestor's was descended from Patan, Rajasthan of Torawati in 16th century.

References

Villages in Chittorgarh district